Galatheavalvidae is a family of bivalves belonging to the order Venerida.

Genera:
 Galatheavalva Knudsen, 1970

References

Venerida
Bivalve families